This article lists the squads for the 2019 Turkish Women's Cup, the 2nd edition of the Turkish Women's Cup. The cup consisted of a series of friendly games, and was held in Turkey from 27 February to 5 March 2019. The eight national teams involved in the tournament registered a squad of over 20 players.

The age listed for each player is on 27 February 2019, the first day of the tournament. The numbers of caps and goals listed for each player do not include any matches played after the start of tournament. The club listed is the club for which the player last played a competitive match prior to the tournament. The nationality for each club reflects the national association (not the league) to which the club is affiliated. A flag is included for coaches that are of a different nationality than their own national team.

Group A

India
Coach: Maymol Rocky

The 24-player squad was announced on 21 February 2019. Crystal Pinto and K Tony Devi were called up as reserve players.

Romania
Coach: Mirel Albon

The 20-player squad was announced on 22 February 2019. Erika Geréd withdrew from the squad and was replaced by Cristina Carp.

Turkmenistan
Coach:

Uzbekistan
Coach: Bakhrom Norsafarov

Group B

France B
Coach: Jean-François Niemezcki

The 20-player squad was announced on 1 March 2019.

Jordan
Coach:  Azzedine Chih

A 24-player preliminary squad was announced on 23 February 2019. The final 22-player squad was announced two days later.

Kazakhstan
Coach: Razia Nurkenova

The 22-player squad was announced on 12 February 2019.

Northern Ireland
Coach: Alfie Wylie

The 22-player squad was announced on 25 February 2019.

Player representation
The information represents only the eight national teams taking part in the competition.

By club
Clubs with 4 or more players represented are listed.

By club nationality

By club federation

By representatives of domestic league

References

Turkish Women's Cup